Brousse is the name or part of the name of the following communes in France:

 Brousse, Creuse, in the Creuse department
 Brousse, Puy-de-Dôme, in the Puy-de-Dôme department
 Brousse, Tarn, in the Tarn department
 Brousse-le-Château, in the Aveyron department
 La Brousse, in the Charente-Maritime department

See also
Labrousse, a commune in France
Brousses (disambiguation)
Brousse, a kind of cheese
Bursa, a city in Turkey known as Brousse in French